John Wanjau (born 3 June 1958) is a Kenyan boxer. He competed at the 1984 Summer Olympics and the 1988 Summer Olympics.

References

1958 births
Living people
Kenyan male boxers
Olympic boxers of Kenya
Boxers at the 1984 Summer Olympics
Boxers at the 1988 Summer Olympics
Commonwealth Games competitors for Kenya
Boxers at the 1982 Commonwealth Games
African Games gold medalists for Kenya
African Games medalists in boxing
Place of birth missing (living people)
Competitors at the 1987 All-Africa Games
Featherweight boxers